The Electromobile was an English electric car manufactured from 1901 until 1920.  The product of a London company, it was offered as part of a contract hire scheme as early as 1904.  From 1903 the engine was mounted on the rear axle.  The design of the car changed little until after World War I; in 1919 a new model, the short-bonneted 8/13 hp Elmo electric, appeared.

See also 
 Electromobility
 List of car manufacturers of the United Kingdom

References

Electric car models
Defunct motor vehicle manufacturers of England
Vehicle manufacturing companies established in 1920
Vehicle manufacture in London
Defunct companies based in London